Luca Siligardi (born 26 January 1988) is an Italian professional footballer who plays as an attacking midfielder for Feralpisalò.

Club career
A native from the province of Reggio Emilia, he started his career at regional team likes Campagnola and Riese, and Dorando Pietri in the province of Modena. He joined one of the most famous club in Emilia-Romagna, Parma F.C. for one season, before returned to Dorando Pietri and played in Eccellenza.

In summer 2006, he joined Inter, and made his first team debut on 17 January 2008, a Coppa Italia match that won Reggina 3–0. In that match, he replaced Dejan Stanković in half time. He played another against S.S. Lazio, a semi-final first leg of Coppa Italia, on 16 April 2008.

Siligardi renewed his contract with Inter until 30 June 2012 and completed two loan moves to Bari and Piacenza for the 2008–09 Serie B season, spending the first half at Bari and the second at Piacenza. On 13 July 2009, Siligardi was loaned to Triestina for the 2009–10 Serie B season. On 16 July 2010, Siligardi was loaned to Bologna for the 2010–11 Serie A season, for €550,000, with option to buy outright for €500,000, with counter-option of €600,000. He signed a contract worth €150,000 annually in net. In June 2011 Bologna excised the rights but Inter activated the counter-option, made Bologna received €50,000 in net as a bonus within a season in order to lent a place for Siligardi.

Livorno
In summer 2011 Simone Dell'Agnello and Siligardi were sold to Livorno as part of Francesco Bardi's deal. Both clubs also retained 50% registration rights of the players. Siligardi signed a four-year contract. In June 2012 Inter acquired Bardi outright, as well as Livorno acquired Dell'Agnello and Siligardi outright.

Verona
On 2 July 2015, Siligardi was signed by Hellas Verona.

Parma
He signed for Parma on 15 July 2017.

On 5 October 2020, Siligardi joined Crotone on loan. On 1 February 2021, he moved on loan to Reggiana.

Feralpisalò
On 29 January 2022, he moved to Feralpisalò.

References

External links

1988 births
Living people
People from Correggio, Emilia-Romagna
Association football midfielders
Footballers from Emilia-Romagna
Italian footballers
Inter Milan players
S.S.C. Bari players
Piacenza Calcio 1919 players
U.S. Triestina Calcio 1918 players
Bologna F.C. 1909 players
U.S. Livorno 1915 players
Hellas Verona F.C. players
Parma Calcio 1913 players
F.C. Crotone players
A.C. Reggiana 1919 players
FeralpiSalò players
Serie A players
Serie B players
Sportspeople from the Province of Reggio Emilia